Stanley Juan Pasarell (born February 11, 1948) is a Puerto Rican former professional tennis player.

Born into a famous Puerto Rican tennis family in San Juan, Pasarell was the 14 and under Orange Bowl champion in 1962 and played collegiate tennis for Stanford University. He is the younger brother of Charlie Pasarell.

Pasarell was singles runner-up to Rafael Osuna at the 1966 Central American and Caribbean Games and won two further silver medals in doubles. He competed in the demonstration event at the 1968 Summer Olympics.

References

External links
 
 

1948 births
Living people
Puerto Rican male tennis players
People from Santurce, Puerto Rico
Sportspeople from San Juan, Puerto Rico
Central American and Caribbean Games silver medalists for Puerto Rico
Central American and Caribbean Games medalists in tennis
Competitors at the 1966 Central American and Caribbean Games
Tennis players at the 1968 Summer Olympics